"Unity Is Strength" is a Chinese patriotic song written by Mu Hong and Lu Su in June 1943. Despite being written as the finale act to an opera of the same name, the song gained popularity as a standalone anti-Japanese propaganda piece, and soon became widely used among numerous Chinese guerrilla groups, most notably the Chinese Communist Party. The song remains a popular patriotic song today, and in an online poll hosted by the State Administration of Press, Publication, Radio, Film and Television in 2015, Unity is Strength was voted among the top ten songs of the Second Sino-Japanese War.

History
Unity is Strength was jointly written in June 1943 by Mu Hong, also the composer of I Love the Eighth Route Army and a major contributor to the production of the Yellow River Cantata, and Lu Su, another well known Chinese communist musician. Allegedly, the song was written in only three days after the lukewarm reception of an opera they had produced under the same name. After facing criticism that the opera ended too abruptly, the two wrote Unity is Strength as a finale act.

The piece was written in a small mountain village in Shaanxi Province, with the lyrics reportedly inspired by the harsh treatment of local peasants by their landlords, and the song was used by the peasants in attempts to appeal for lowered rent. The song quickly became popular throughout Western and Northern China, and was adopted by the Chinese Communist Party as one of their most frequently used pieces both during and after the Chinese Civil War. The song remains a popular piece to this day, and has been performed at numerous significant points in Chinese history, being used during the Bao Jia Weiguo Campaign during the Korean War, during the 1998 Chinese Flood relief, and being sung at the 2008 Beijing Olympics.

Lyrics

See also

Maoism
"Solidarity Forever"
"Ode to the Motherland"
"Sailing the Seas Depends on the Helmsman"
"Without the Communist Party, There Would Be No New China"

References

External links
A modern recording of the piece

Cultural Revolution
Chinese patriotic songs
Maoist China propaganda songs
Asian anthems